United Nations Security Council Resolution 184, adopted unanimously on December 16, 1963, after examining the application of the Zanzibar for membership in the United Nations, the Council recommended to the General Assembly that Zanzibar be admitted.

See also
List of United Nations Security Council Resolutions 101 to 200 (1953–1965)

References
Text of the Resolution at undocs.org

External links
 

 0184
History of Zanzibar
Foreign relations of Zanzibar
 0184
 0184
1963 in Zanzibar
Sultanate of Zanzibar
December 1963 events